Neoprocris floridana, the laurelcherry smoky moth, is a species of moth belonging to the family Zygaenidae. It has been found in the southeastern United States, where all recordings have occurred in Florida with the exception of one in Lee County, Alabama. As its name suggests it is thought to feed primarily on laurelcherry trees (Prunus caroliniana). Because p. caroliniana is found throughout the southeast, it is reasonable to suspect these species migrate through and inhabit multiple, if not all, southeastern states.

References

http://entnemdept.ufl.edu/creatures/MISC/MOTHS/Neoprocris_floridana.htm
http://enpp.auburn.edu/outreach/web-publications/stinging-caterpillars/

List of moths of North America (MONA 4618-5509)

Procridinae
Zygaenidae
Moths described in 1984